Zhang Xingbo (born 13 April 1981) is a male Chinese rower. He competed for Team China at the 2008 Summer Olympics.

External links
 http://2008teamchina.olympic.cn/index.php/personview/personsen/5487
 

1981 births
Living people
Chinese male rowers
Olympic rowers of China
Rowers at the 2008 Summer Olympics
Place of birth missing (living people)
21st-century Chinese people